"Loneliness" is a song by German disc jockey Tomcraft. It was written by Ivan Matias, Andrea Martin, Thomas Bruckner and Eniac and produced by Eniac and Tomcraft. The song is based on an excerpt of Martin's 1999 single "Share the Love". "Loneliness" was released as a single in 2002 in Germany and on 28 April 2003 in the United Kingdom. The single peaked at number 10 on the German Singles Chart and topped the UK Singles Chart.

British singer-songwriter Will Young sampled the song for his 2015 single "Love Revolution".

Track listings

German maxi-CD single
 "Loneliness" (radio cut) – 3:47
 "Loneliness" (video cut) – 3:53
 "Loneliness" (klub cut) – 7:50
 "Schwabing 7. Phase (Where Are You Now)" – 4:25

German 12-inch vinyl
A. "Loneliness" (klub mix) – 7:50
B. "Loneliness" (MUC remix) – 5:51

UK CD single
 "Loneliness" (radio edit)
 "Loneliness" (Benny Benassi remix)
 "Loneliness" (MUC remix)
 "Loneliness" (CD ROM video)

UK cassette single
 "Loneliness" (radio edit)
 "Loneliness" (Cheekyness remix)

Credits and personnel
Credits are adapted from the German maxi-CD single liner notes.

Studio
 Recorded in August 2002 at Elektroraum (Berlin, Germany)

Personnel

 Andrea Martin – writing
 Ivan Matias – writing
 Edmund Clement – writing
 Eniac – writing, production

 Tomcraft – production
 Robin Felder – vocal production
 Factor Product Designagentur – artwork

Charts

Weekly charts

Year-end charts

Release history

References

2002 singles
2002 songs
2003 singles
Data Records singles
Ministry of Sound singles
Number-one singles in Scotland
Songs written by Andrea Martin (musician)
Songs written by Ivan Matias
Techno songs
Tomcraft songs
Trance songs
UK Singles Chart number-one singles